Brian "Doc" Dougherty (born December 10, 1973) is a retired Hall of Fame American lacrosse goaltender.  He attended The Episcopal Academy before attending University of Maryland. He is currently the head coach at Springside Chestnut Hill Academy.

Overview
Dougherty is one of the most decorated and accomplished goaltenders in the history of lacrosse. He is a three-time recipient of the Major League Lacrosse Goaltender of the Year Award, and was awarded the Ensign C. Markland Kelly, Jr. Award in back to back years in as the NCAA Goaltender of the Year.

In 1995, with the Terrapins, Dougherty was named the NCAA tournament MVP. Dougherty was selected to the National Lacrosse Hall of Fame in 2012.

MLL career
Dougherty played with the Philadelphia Barrage from 2005 to 2008, played with the Long Island Lizards from 2003 to 2004 and Rochester Rattlers from 2001 to 2002.

Dougherty has been part of three Steinfeld Cup Championship teams: the Long Island Lizards in 2001, the Philadelphia Barrage in 2006, and again in 2007.  He has appeared in many Major League Lacrosse All-Star Games 

He was also the starting goalie for 1998 United States Lacrosse team that won the World Lacrosse Championship.

Professional Lacrosse Hall of Fame
On June 18, 2022, Dougherty was inducted into the Professional Lacrosse Hall of Fame as one of the eleven members of the inaugural class of inductees.

NLL career
Dougherty has also played box lacrosse in the National Lacrosse League for the Philadelphia Wings and the Baltimore Thunder, though he played sparingly.

Coaching career
Dougherty has coached Division II Chestnut Hill College since 2011.

Statistics

MLL

NLL

See also
 Maryland Terrapins men's lacrosse
 Lacrosse in Pennsylvania

Awards

References

1973 births
Living people
American lacrosse players
College men's lacrosse coaches in the United States
Major League Lacrosse major award winners
Major League Lacrosse players
Maryland Terrapins men's lacrosse players
Philadelphia Wings players
Sportspeople from Philadelphia
Episcopal Academy alumni
Chestnut Hill Griffins men's lacrosse coaches